Novosphingobium gossypii  is a Gram-negative, rod-shaped and non-spore-forming bacterium from the genus Novosphingobium which has been isolated from tissues from the plant Gossypium hirsutum.

References

External links
Type strain of Novosphingobium gossypii at BacDive -  the Bacterial Diversity Metadatabase	

Bacteria described in 2015
Sphingomonadales